Fergusson College is an autonomous public-private college offering various courses in the streams of arts and science in the city of Pune, India. It was founded in 1885 by the Vaman Shriram Apte, Bal Gangadhar Tilak, Vishnushashtri Chiplunkar, Mahadeo Ballal Namjoshi and Gopal Krishna Agarkar. Professor Vaman Shivram Apte was its first principal. Social reformer, journalist, thinker and educationist Gopal Ganesh Agarkar served as the second principal from August 1892, till his death in June 1895.

The college is named after Scottish-born Sir James Fergusson, the Governor of Bombay, the college has been under the jurisdiction of the University of Pune. In May 2018, Fergusson college was upgraded to a unitary university following an update from Ministry of HRD.

The college has two sections:
 The Junior Wing (junior college) is for students graduating from school. Courses are offered in Arts and Science streams, at the end of which students may appear for the Higher-Secondary State Certificate examination.
 The Senior Wing offers bachelor's degrees in 29 disciplines and master's degrees in 16 disciplines.

Fergusson College is known for its close association with Indian politics. Its founders were pioneers of the Indian National Congress, as well as, Indian Socialist Movement. The college has produced, several ministers and legislators, including two Indian Prime Ministers.

Fergusson was among the 19 colleges to get a heritage tag by the central government and UGC in 2015. So, the college receives financial help from UGC for the conservation of campus and buildings.

History

Foundation

After the suppression of the Indian Rebellion of 1857, reformers in India felt a pressing need to modernise the educational system in order to advance the cause of reform. Prominent Indian nationalists, such as Bal Gangadhar Tilak, Vishnushastri Chiplunkar, and Gopal Ganesh Agarkar led efforts to found a school designed for the general advancement of the Indian public; leading to the creation of the New English School. Inspired by the school's success, the Deccan Education Society was formed in 1884; a year later Fergusson College was established.

The college was inaugurated by William Wordsworth, the grandson of the British poet and principal of Elphinstone College in Bombay. Other leaders such as R G Bhandarkar and M G Ranade played a part in the construction. The college was named after the then Governor of Bombay, Sir James Fergusson. The British colonial government in Bombay allowed the college to remain autonomous, giving it a free hand in education.

In 1935, the college completed 50 years of existence. Sir CV Raman, India's only Science Nobel laureate at that time, was the president of the Golden Jubilee celebrations. He said in his speech, 
Mahatma Gandhi, in a message to then Principal Dr. Mahajani wrote,

Post-independence
Post-1947, Fergusson College has produced leaders in the fields of politics, academia, literature and art. Dr. Rajendra Prasad, India's first president, was the chief guest of the platinum jubilee function. He said on the occasion,

In 1985, the college completed its centenary. Rajiv Gandhi, the then prime minister was the president of the ceremony. PV Narasimharao, India's 12th prime minister and former student, said, 

A two-part history of the college was written by Dr. VM Bachal, former principal. The book, Vatchal Sawashe Varshanchi (A Journey of 125 Years) was published in January 2010.

In 2018, Fergusson was given University status by the Ministry of Human resource development.

Association with Indian politics
Fergusson College has been given many epithets by political leaders, including 'cradle of Indian polity' and 'twin of the Congress'. 
The founders of Fergusson College, most notably Tilak and Gokhale, were leaders of the Indian National Congress in its early stages from 1885 to 1920. In fact, most historians divide the history of the INC into two eras — the Tilak Era and the Gandhi era. The college has produced as alumni, notable Congress leaders including Vishwanath Pratap Singh and PV Narasimha Rao, Jivatram Kripalani and Babubhai J Patel. (See comprehensive list below.)

Among the founders, Agarkar and Namjoshi were early Socialists of Maharashtra. Alumni such as Vitthal Ramji Shinde, S.M. Joshi, and Nanasaheb Gore were eminent socialists, inside and outside the Congress fold. The Samyukta Maharashtra Movement, founded to fight for Maharashtra's statehood, included several alumni such as Prahlad Keshav Atre, SM Joshi and Gore. V.D Savarkar, in 1902, enrolled in Fergusson College. As a young man, he was inspired by the new generation of radical political leaders —
Bal Gangadhar Tilak, Bipin Chandra Pal and Lala Lajpat Rai — along with the political struggle against the partition of Bengal and the rising Swadeshi campaign. After completing his degree, nationalist activist Shyamji Krishna Varma helped Vinayak to go to England to study law, on a scholarship.

Fergusson is the only institution in India to have in its alumni two Indian prime ministers.

Campus
The campus extends until the slopes of a hillock, popularly called Fergusson Hill. Several educational institutions are around the hillock. The college is largely built in accordance with the Victorian school of architecture, although it has some Gothic and traditional Indian styles as well.

Buildings

The Main Building is at the inner entrance of the college. Built entirely in Victorian style, the two-storey structure houses the central office and the principals' chambers. The Statistics and Psychology Departments lie to the east of the main building; the Economics Department lie to the west. The computer science and the life science buildings are also to the west.

On the southern side are the RP Paranjpye building, Pittie Chemistry building, Botany, Zoology, Geology, Electronics and Physics departments. The building overlooks the central garden to the north and has two lecture halls and the staffs' chambers. There are 55 laboratories and 51 lecture halls in all.

NM Wadia Amphitheatre

The three-storeyed amphitheatre building, to the west of the central garden, has Victorian-Gothic influences. Apart from several lecture halls, the building houses an auditorium with a capacity of 1,000 people. In 2012, this amphitheatre celebrated its 100 years.

Bai Jerbai Wadia Library
Bai Jerbai Wadia Library was built in 1929 by industrialists Sir Cusrow Wadia and Sir Ness Wadia in memory of their mother. The Main Library on the ground floor has more than 300,000 books and research journals. Research scholars and book-lovers have donated their collections.

The first floor (the floor above the ground floor) of the library serves as a Reading Hall for students and accommodates 400 students. The floors above this floor are not publicly accessible without prior arrangement and house books, manuscripts, and articles of historic and cultural importance. The library has a collection of statues and posters, dedicated to national leaders and educationalists. The building was extended in 1955, with government grants and then in 1982 with grants from the Central government.

Kimaya
Kimaya is an open-air theatre on the north side of the campus. It was conceived by litterateur and alumni PL Deshpande on his return from a visit to Japan. It encompasses elements of modern architecture and is built without beams. It has eight walls fused together, which function as trusses.

Botanical Gardens
The  Botanical Gardens on the campus were founded in 1902 by a teacher, Professor Shevade. Botany students from the college planted specimens here, including Elaeocarpus, Araucaria and Mahogany. In 1961, the garden was destroyed when the nearby Panshet dam was breached. Years later, it was reinstated by the Pune Municipal Corporation (PMC), the Association of Herbal Drugs, and Deccan Education Society. Some plants found there are Saraca Indica (Sita Ashok), the bark of which is used to heal skin diseases and as a tonic; and Terminalia arjuna, the extract of which is used to treat jaundice.

Gymkhana and grounds
Cricket, hockey and football are played on the main ground which has a drainage system, enabling play during monsoons. Two asphalted basketball courts are next to the main ground. A second ground, to the south, has courts for volleyball and handball as well as facilities for Indian sports like Kabaddi, Kho-Kho and Mallakhamb. Services for badminton and other indoor games are available, and the Gymnasium Building provides training for boxing, wrestling, judo, weight lifting and yoga. The college has tennis courts on the eastern side of the campus.

New academic complex
The new academic complex was built in 2004 at the northern end of the campus. Unlike the other buildings, it is designed in a modern functionalist style. It houses the Junior College and the DES Law College.

Residences

For students, there are six hostel blocks, four blocks for boys and two for girls. The total intake capacity of the hostels is 587 students. The gents hostel blocks are to the north of the campus and the ladies hostel blocks lie to the east.

The college has some quarters for the faculty and staff and also for employees of other DES Institutes.

The principal resides in an independent bungalow at the main entrance of the college. Some members of the teaching staff have been provided with residential facilities on the campus. This facility includes independent bungalows. There are some flats constructed with financial aid from the UGC.

Academics
In 2014 Fergusson College started special courses for upgrading skills of the national youth. The following courses have begun in the same year:
 Bachelor of Vocation in Media and Communication
 Bachelor of Vocation in Digital Art and Animation

The courses offer hands on skill experience with overall personality development of the student. The course consists of Photography, Voice Over, Script Writing, Media Research, Advertising, Video Editing, Journalism, Broadcast Journalism, Short Film making, and Media Research. In 2019 and 2020 Media and Communication Department organised Fergusson International Short Film Festival. It was one of the biggest short film festival organised by any college department in India.

Rankings
In 2020, Fergusson College was ranked 42nd among colleges in India by National Institutional Ranking Framework. It has also received National Heritage status and College of Excellence award by University Grants Commission (India).

Fergusson College has ranked in the top ten arts and science colleges in India for the past 16 years in the annual survey conducted by India Today-AC Nielsen-ORG-MARG and published in India Today magazine. In the state of Maharashtra, it is consistently ranked first in science and arts, followed by St. Xavier's College, Mumbai.

Departments
Senior wing of Fergusson University has 14 arts and 16 science departments.

Arts

Departments:
Marathi,
Hindi,
Economics,
English,
French,
Geography,
German,
Gymkhana,
History,
Philosophy,
Political science,
Psychology,
Sanskrit, and
Sociology.

Science

Departments:
Animation,
Biotechnology,
Botany,
Chemistry,
Computer Science,
Digital Art and Animation,
Electronics Science,
Environmental science,
Geology,
Mathematics,
Media and Communication,
Microbiology,
Photography,
Physics,
Statistics, and
Zoology.

Associated institutes
The college shares its campus with the Institute of Management Development and Research, Pune (IMDR) and Jaganath Rathi Vocational Guidance and Training Institute (JRVGTI), both governed by the Deccan Education Society. Brihan Maharashtra College of Commerce (BMCC), established in 1943, is closely associated with Fergusson College. At the northern end of the campus, next to the New Academic Building, lies DES Law College.

Student life

National Cadet Corps
National Cadet Corps training began in Fergusson College in 1921 with the University Training Corps unit which had two platoons. In 1926, the UTC strength of increased to three platoons. In June 1930, one platoon of the College of Engineering was transferred to the Fergusson College and since then Fergusson College enjoyed the privilege of contributing full company — α coy — and was reputed as the Best Drilling Company.

There are two units of NCC in Fergusson College — Army and Navy wings. In the Army wing, cadets are trained by the representative of the Indian Armed Forces at the junior and senior level. They are seen as future officers or army personnel or as possible reserves in the case of national emergency. In the Naval wing, cadets are trained as per the naval rules and discipline at the senior as well as on junior level. They are considered as reserves, second in line of defence in case of national emergency. Apart from these, the open units in the college are Girls Wing, Air Wing, Signal Wing, Armed Squadron and Medical Wing.

National Service Scheme
National Service Scheme (NSS) is a community service program sponsored by the Ministry of Human Resources Development, Government of India. The motto of the NSS is ‘Not Me But You’, and its objective is developing the personality of the student through community service.

The NSS Unit of Fergusson College was started in 1975 with about 50 students. Presently the NSS Unit consists of about 200 students from senior college and 100 students from junior college. The activities of the NSS are to help the students understand community, their relation with community, National Integration, and Social problems.

Periodicals
The photography department, with contributions from current and former students, brings out an e-magazine, Fergzine.

SAATHI

Astro Club
The Astro Club is an activity started in 1997. Apart from weekly lectures, problem solving sessions and documentary screening, students also organise Physics/Astronomy exhibitions, seminars, workshops, sky observations, Space Week and Asteroid hunt program. "Frontiers in Physics" is a unique annual seminar organised by the students exclusively for the students with speakers from national and international institutions. Students also publish "Dimensions" a special science bulletin each term.

Notable alumni

 P. V. Narasimha Rao (1921–2004) — 9th Prime Minister of India
 Vishwanath Pratap Singh (1931–2008) — 7th Prime Minister of India.
 Vinayak Damodar Savarkar (Veer Savarkar) (1883–1966) — Hindu nationalist advocate, president of the Hindu Mahasabha, Author, Poet, a Nationalist & reformer
 Shubhangi Kulkarni (born 1959) - former India women captain, Arjuna awardee and secretary of erstwhile Women's Cricket Association of India
 P. L. Deshpande (1919–2000) — Marathi writer, actor, music composer, film and television producer, film director, music director & a great philanthrope. Famous as "Maharashtra's beloved personality"
 Ram Ganesh Gadkari (1885–1919) — Marathi playwright, poet and writer
 Prahlad Keshav Atre 1898 – 1969) — playwright (Shyamchi Aai (film)); leader of the Samyukta Maharashtra Movement
B. V. Doshi - An Indian architect, first Indian architect to receive the Pritzker Architecture Prize, awarded with Padma Shri and the Padma Bhushan
 Shreedhar Mahadev Joshi (1904-1989) - An Indian Socialist politician who played a major role in the Samyukta Maharashtra Samiti for the creation of Maharashtra state.
 R. P. Paranjpe (1876–1966) — mathematician, first Indian to become Senior Wrangler at Cambridge University, former principal of Fergusson College
 Shriram Lagoo (born 1927–2019) — film and theatre actor
 Burgula Ramakrishna Rao (1899–1967) — activist for freedom of Hyderabad State, 2nd Chief Minister of the state
 Smita Patil  (1955–1986) — film actress (Mirch Masala, Manthan, Chakra); double National Award Winner for Best Actress
 Narayan Sitaram Phadke (1894-1978) — Marathi writer
 J. B. Kripalani (1888–1982) — Indian independence activist, former president of the Indian National Congress
Vishnu Sakharam Khandekar- author, The first Marathi author to win the prestigious Jnanpith Award
D.R. Bendre - Kannada Poet, Jnanpith Award
 Vasant Kanetkar — playwright, Padma Shri awardee
 Madhav Gadgil (born 1942) — Ecologist, Padma Bhushan awardee
 Sai Paranjpye (born 1938) — Film Director & Screen Writer, Winner of National Film Awards & Filmfare Awards, Padma Bhushan awardee
 Bhalchandra Nemade (born 1938) — Marathi language writer, Padma Shri and Jnanpith Award recipient
 Dattatreya Gopal Karve (1898–1967) — Economist, first principal of Brihan Maharashtra College of Commerce, Vice Chancellor of Pune University and Deputy Governor of Reserve Bank of India
 Irawati Karve (1905–1970) — sociologist, anthropologist, educationist, and writer
 Stephie D'Souza (1936–1998) — Indian athlete who won gold, silver and bronze medals at the 1954 and 1958 Asian Games.
 N. H. Antia (1922–2007) — plastic surgeon and Padma Shri recipient
 Radhika Apte (born 1985) — actress
 Padmanabhan Balaram — biochemist, Padma Bhushan recipient
 Pooja Batra (born 1979) — actress and model, Miss India 1993
 Milind Date — composer, flautist
 Bhaskar Chandavarkar (1936–2009) — sitar player, academic and composer
 Chandrashekhar Agashe (1888–1956) — industrialist

 Suyash Tilak (born 1987) — film and television actor
 Prahlad Kakkar (born 1950) — ad film maker
 Suresh Kalmadi (born 1944) — politician and sports administrator
 D. R. Kaprekar (1905–1986) — mathematician, discovered Kaprekar's constant and the Kaprekar number
 Sonali Kulkarni (born 1974) — film actress, columnist and writer
 Shital Mahajan (born 1982) — skydiver, Padma Shri recipient
 Kiran Nagarkar (born 1942) — playwright, novelist

 Vitthal Ramji Shinde (1873–1944) — social activist, founder of Depressed Classes Mission in Mumbai
 Pandurang Vasudeo Sukhatme (1911–1997) — statistician
 S. R. Rana (1870–1957) — Indian political activist
 Suniti Ashok Deshpande — educator and promoter of Russian language and culture in India; recipient of the Medal of Pushkin
 Kranti Kanade — film director and screenwriter
 Sonalee Kulkarni — Marathi film actress
 Nandini Nimbkar — president, Nimbkar Agricultural Research Institute; member, Senate and Academic Council, Shivaji University
 Babubhai J. Patel (1911-2002) — 6th Chief Minister of Gujarat
 Kaka Kalelkar - Indian independence activist, social reformer, journalist and an eminent follower of the philosophy and methods of Mahatma Gandhi
 Chandrakant Sardeshmukh — sitar player, first Master Fellow of the National Centre for the Performing Arts (India)
 Balasaheb Thorat — member of Maharashtra Legislative Assembly and former Minister of Agrriculture and Revenue, Government of Maharashtra
 Damodar Dharmananda Kosambi (1907–1966), former head of the Dept of Mathematics at Ferguson College
 Y. K. Sohoni (1911-2003) - Professor of French (1944–58) and recipient of the Chevalier dans l'Ordre Palmes Académiques awarded by the Government of France
 Devesh Chandra Thakur — Member of Bihar Legislative Council from Tirhut graduate constituency and former Cabinet minister of Bihar.
 Gautam Bambawale - Senior diplomat. Indian envoy to China. 
 Vasantrao Ghatge- Businessman
 Sriram Raghavan-Film maker, Director
 Manu S. Pillai-Writer, Historian, Sahitya Akademi Yuva Puraskar awardee(2017)
 Amandeep Singh — Indian Footballer
 Supratim Bhol - Indian Cinematographer
 Aarya Ambekar (born 1994) — singer
 Parna Pethe born 1990

References

External links

 

 
Colleges affiliated to Savitribai Phule Pune University
Universities and colleges in Pune
Schools in Colonial India
Bal Gangadhar Tilak
Deccan Education Society
Educational institutions established in 1884
1884 establishments in British India
British colonial architecture in India